Hygrotus quinquelineatus  is a species of Dytiscidae native to Europe.

References

Hygrotus
Beetles described in 1828
Beetles of Europe